Kerry Knowler (born 26 August 1967 in Sydney) is an Australian rower. She competed in the women's quadruple sculls event at the 2000 Summer Olympics in Sydney.

References

Australian female rowers
Rowers at the 2000 Summer Olympics
Rowers from Sydney
Olympic rowers of Australia
1967 births
Living people